The Jamestown Titans were a semi-professional ice hockey team in North Eastern Hockey League (NEHL) based in Jamestown, New York.

A postmortem on the team and the league written by The Post-Journal noted that the team was not particularly well remembered in Jamestown hockey history. The team's existence was marred by poor organizational changes, scheduling games at odd times and ever-changing ticket prices. The team's name was said to have come from "a computer football game."

The Titans were led in scoring by league All Star Rob Madia and winger Dave Kamatovic finished the 2003-04 regular season in second place behind the Mohawk Valley Comets. The team also featured Oshawa and Peterborough Ontario Junior A Hockey grads Mike Thompson, Wes Neild and Brad Chapman   In the playoffs, Jamestown played the York IceCats a 2 game series for the league Championship (as Mohawk Valley declined to participate in the playoffs). If there were a tie after the 2 games they would play a 20-minute mini game.  York won the opening game, 8-5. Jamestown defeated York 9-1 in the second game and then won a 20-minute tiebreaker game 6-1. As league champions, Rob Madia accepted the Herb Brooks Memorial Trophy on behalf of the Titans.

Regular season records

External links

North Eastern Hockey League teams
Sports in Jamestown, New York